Ministry of Transport and Communications of the Republic of Lithuania is the main institution in Lithuania, which coordinates the work of road, rail, air, water, transport, postal and electronic communications sector and implements the strategy and politics of state government. The Ministry of Transport and Communications shall be a budgetary institution financed from the State budget of the Republic of Lithuania.

History
When Lithuania regained its independence the new Government was formed on 22 March 1990, and the Ministry of Transport and Communications was re-established as well. From the very first days of its activities the most important tasks of the Ministry included taking over of the transport sector from the subordination of all-union ministries, creation of new transport strategy and legal system, integration of the Lithuanian transport sector into the European transport network.

Ministers

Role and responsibilities
The Ministry seeks: 
 to fulfil the requirements of European Union legislation in the areas of transport, post and electronic communications;
 to modernize the transport infrastructure;
 to integrate the main highways of the country into the trans-European networks;
 to enable the development of transport business, transparent competition;
 to improve transport and communication service quality;
 to promote multimodal transport, logistics centers, public setting;
 to coordinate activities in the areas of transport, post and electronic communications;
 to take part in the development of the traffic safety policy for all modes of transport;
 to take part in the development of the policy on the reduction of negative environmental impacts of transport areas.

The most important transport and communication infrastructure development projects

Rail Baltica is one of the priority projects of the European Union Trans-European Transport Networks (TEN-T).European gauge railway is going to link Helsinki and Tallinn, Riga, Kaunas and Warsaw. The project is funded by the European Union's TEN-T, the Cohesion Fund and the Lithuanian State, started in 2010.

Via Baltica is known as a part of the European route E67 between Warsaw and Tallinn. International Via Baltica project is helping to create better traffic conditions between the Central, Western Europe and Baltic countries.

RAIN – the project of developing the broadband Internet in all rural areas of the country. This project will be completed in 2013. The project goal is to provide broadband access to all rural districts of public administrations, hospitals, laboratories, schools, museums, libraries, public Internet access points.

MEZON 4G Internet, acting on the basis of advanced wireless technologies, providing extremely high speed (download speed - up to 10 Mbit/s). MEZON Internet operates in 53 cities and towns, it is available for about 60 percent of Lithuania's population. It is planned next year to allow MEZON mobile Internet access across the densely populated territory of Lithuania.

Dredging of Klaipėda state sea port basin, construction and reconstruction of embankments (2004–2010), improving facilities of freight and passenger service.

Reconstruction of Sventoji Port. Started in 2010. The port is going to maintain recreational, small, sport, fishing boats, small sea cruise and passenger ships.

Construction of deep-water port in Klaipėda (planned).

Reconstruction of Jakai roundabout (2010, completed the first stage of reconstruction). 4-lane overhead road is linking Kaunas and Klaipėda directions.

Reconstruction of Railway tunnel in Kaunas (2008)

Modernization of Kena border railway statio (2008)

Institutions under the Ministry of Transport and Communications

 State Road Transport Inspectorate
 State Railway Inspectorate
 Lithuanian Road Administration
 Directorate of border crossing infrastructure
 Information Society Development Committee

Institutions and Enterprises under the regulation of the Ministry
 Vilnius International Airport
 Kaunas Airport
 Palanga International Airport
 SE Air Navigation
 SE Inland Waterways Authority
 Klaipėda State Seaport
 SE Railway Design
 PC Aukstaitijos siaurasis gelezinkelis
 SC Problematika
 SE Transport and Road Research Institute
 SC Lithuanian Post
 The State of inland navigation office
 Transport Investment Directorate
 PI "Placiajuostis internetas"
 Civil Aviation Administration
 The Lithuanian Maritime Safety Administration
 AB "Lithuanian Railways"
 JSC "Gelezinkelio apsaugos zeldiniai"
 JSC "Smiltynes perkela"
 JSC "Detonas"
 SE Lithuanian Radio and Television Centre
 JSC "Lithuanian Shipping Company"

See also

References

 REGULATIONS OF THE MINISTRY OF TRANSPORT AND COMMUNICATIONS OF THE REPUBLIC OF LITHUANIA. 

 
Lithuania
Lithuania
Transport